Marie Janssen (born 1899, date of death unknown) was a Belgian tennis player. She competed in the women's singles event at the 1924 Summer Olympics.

References

External links
 

1899 births
Year of death missing
Belgian female tennis players
Olympic tennis players of Belgium
Tennis players at the 1924 Summer Olympics
Place of birth missing
20th-century Belgian women